Dieter Wemhöner (born 18 August 1930) is a former amateur boxing middleweight who won a gold medal at the 1953 European Amateur Boxing Championships. He represented West Germany in the 1952 Olympics, reaching the third round; and the United Team of Germany at the 1956 Olympics, reaching the second round.

Wemhöner is married and has two sons, Thilo (born 1959) and Jens (born 1961).

References

External links

1930 births
Living people
Boxers from Berlin
Olympic boxers of Germany
Olympic boxers of the United Team of Germany
Boxers at the 1952 Summer Olympics
Boxers at the 1956 Summer Olympics
Middleweight boxers
German male boxers